Captain 11 is an after-school children's program for over 41 years on KELO-TV, broadcast on channel 11 from Sioux Falls, South Dakota.  Station weatherman Dave Dedrick donned a yellow-trimmed blue pilot uniform with hat and daily (later weekly as cable TV began to cut into its ratings) became the jolly host of the show.  The show primarily played cartoons and other children's fare, and featured the Captain having all the kids (his "crew") introduce themselves on the air, guessing to win the toy chest, and children with birthdays working the Captain's control panel of lights and switches.  The show ended with the Captain playing the "freezeberg" game with the children, having them: Face the camera and wave one hand: then wave both hands: followed by wave both hands and one foot then wave both hands and both feet which usually resulted in most of the kids jumping up and down while facing the camera.  Finally, the Captain would tell them to "freeze", not moving a muscle as the camera panned over the crowd of kids attempting to remain still.

The Captain 11 charge
The show opened with an animated space scene, slowly zooming in to the Captain's space ship, with this charge voiced over:

"Captain 11! Today's man of the future!"

History
The show ran from March 7, 1955 to December 27, 1996, making it the longest continuously running children's television program in the United States.   Dedrick's autobiography reveals interesting background about the show, like why the character's trademark rubber headphones were eventually discarded after many seasons, and how the set designers could not agree on a single design and eventually had to work independently on their own sections.

Dave Dedrick retired from broadcasting on December 30, 1996.  He was inducted into the South Dakota Broadcasters Hall of Fame on April 18, 1997, and into the South Dakota Hall of Fame in 1999.  Dedrick died in Sioux Falls on January 22, 2010, at the age of 81.

The Captain 11 set and other memorabilia is displayed in the State Historical Museum in Pierre.

References

External links
Captain 11
Captain 11 Tribute at Keloland.com

Video Tribute to the Captain
The Unofficial Captain 11 Home Page

Local children's television programming in the United States
South Dakota television shows
1950s American children's television series
1960s American children's television series
1970s American children's television series
1980s American children's television series
1990s American children's television series
1955 American television series debuts
1996 American television series endings